4.2 inch mortar may refer to:

UK
Ordnance ML 4.2 inch Mortar - also known as SB 4.2 inch

US
M2 4.2 inch mortar
M30 mortar